Early in the year 1931, the Kingdom of Hejaz and Nejd, ruled by the House of Saud, engaged in an ill-documented border skirmish against the Mutawakkilite Kingdom of Yemen.

Historical account 
All known details are provided on page 322 of St John Philby's 1955 book Saudi Arabia, which gives the following account:

Commentary 
In an enquiry in 2017, the Correlates of War project was unable to find any further information, and found that The Times did not contain any mention of such incident in all of 1931. Nonetheless, they still believed that such an incident had happened, since Philby was a close associate of Ibn Saud as well as a reputable British Arabist.

See also 

 Najran conflict, a subsequent Saudi–Yemeni conflict

References 

Conflicts in 1931
Wars involving Saudi Arabia
Wars involving Yemen
1931 in Saudi Arabia
Saudi Arabia–Yemen military relations
Kingdom of Yemen